SS Mongolia may refer to:

 , a  British passenger and cargo liner of the Peninsular and Oriental Steam Navigation Company (P&O) (sunk in 1917)
 , a  American passenger and cargo liner of the Pacific Mail Steamship Company
 , a  British passenger and cargo liner of the Peninsular and Oriental Steam Navigation Company (P&O)

See also
  (1890–1914)

Ship names